Tiffen is a cadastral municipality in Steindorf am Ossiacher See, in the district of Feldkirchen in the Austrian state of Carinthia.

Sights
 Catholic parish church

References

Cities and towns in Feldkirchen District